Deep Nebhe Nai (English: The Lamp is Yet Kindled) is a 1970 Bangladeshi film starring Razzak and Kabari opposite him. The film was directed by Narayan Ghosh Mita. It also stars Rozi Samad and Anwara Hossain.

Cast 
 Kabari
 Razzak
 Anwar Hossain
 Rozi Samad

Music
The film's music was composed by Satya Saha with lyrics written by Gazi Mazharul Anwar and Mohammad Moniruzzaman.

References

1970 films
Bengali-language Pakistani films
Films scored by Satya Saha
1970s Bengali-language films
Films directed by Narayan Ghosh Mita